Donald A. Guardian (born June 12, 1953) is an American Republican Party politician who  has represented 2nd Legislative District in the New Jersey General Assembly since taking office on January 11, 2022, when he became the first openly gay Republican legislator in state history. He served as the Mayor of Atlantic City, New Jersey from 2014 to 2017.

Early life and education
Raised in Palisades Park, New Jersey and West New York, Guardian graduated from Don Bosco Preparatory High School. He graduated in 1975 from Upsala College.

Before being elected Mayor, Guardian served as an executive with the Boy Scouts of America and at the Claridge Hotel, and headed Atlantic City's Special Improvement District for two decades prior to his election as mayor.

After his time as Mayor, Guardian was named as Business Administrator by the Toms River, New Jersey Township Council, for which he was paid an annual salary of $175,000.

Elective office
On January 19, 2013, Guardian announced he was challenging incumbent mayor Lorenzo Langford. He won the Republican primary unopposed. On November 5, Guardian defeated Langford by 50% to 47%. In the 2013 United States elections, he defeated incumbent Democratic mayor Lorenzo Langford to become Atlantic City's first openly gay mayor and first Republican mayor since 1990. In the 2017 election, Guardian lost re-election to Democratic city councilman, Frank Gilliam.

Guardian was elected to the State Assembly in 2021, alongside fellow Republican Claire Swift. They defeated the Democratic slate of incumbent Assemblyman John Armato and Atlantic County Commissioner Caren Fitzpatrick; the district's other Assemblyman, Democrat Vince Mazzeo, did not seek reelection to the Assembly in order to make what would ultimately be an unsuccessful bid for the district's State Senate seat.

On January 11, 2022, Guardian was sworn-in to the New Jersey General Assembly. His election makes him the first openly gay Republican legislator in state history and the only openly gay member of the New Jersey Legislature.

Committees 
Committee assignments for the current session are:
Environment and Solid Waste
Special Committee on Infrastructure and Natural Resources
Tourism, Gaming and the Arts

District 2 
Each of the 40 districts in the New Jersey Legislature has one representative in the New Jersey Senate and two members in the New Jersey General Assembly. The representatives from the 2nd District for the 2022—23 Legislative Session are:
Senator Vincent J. Polistina (R)
Assemblyman Don Guardian (R)
Assemblyman Claire Swift (R)

References

External links
Legislative webpage
City of Atlantic City: Mayor Donald A. Guardian 
Campaign website
Atlantic City Mayor Don Guardian on Instagram
Atlantic City Mayor Don Guardian on Twitter
Atlantic City Mayor Don Guardian on Facebook

1953 births
Living people
LGBT state legislators in New Jersey
Gay politicians
LGBT mayors of places in the United States
LGBT people from New Jersey
Mayors of Atlantic City, New Jersey
Republican Party members of the New Jersey General Assembly
21st-century American politicians
21st-century LGBT people
People from Palisades Park, New Jersey
People from West New York, New Jersey
Don Bosco Preparatory High School alumni
Upsala College alumni